The Women's National Basketball Association's All-Decade Team were chosen in 2006 on the occasion of the tenth anniversary of the WNBA from amongst 30 nominees compiled by the league by fan, media, coach, and player voting. The team was to comprise the 10 best and most influential players of the first decade of the WNBA, with consideration also accorded to sportsmanship, community service, leadership, and contribution to the growth of women's basketball; only players to have competed in the WNBA were eligible, but extra-league achievements were considered.

Nine of the first team selections won Olympic gold medals with Team USA, and eight won league championships, including three—Cynthia Cooper-Dyke, Sheryl Swoopes, and Tina Thompson—who won four consecutive titles with the Houston Comets.  Of the ten first-team honorees, only Cooper, who, having retired in 2000 to become head coach of the Phoenix Mercury, played four games during the 2003 season before finally ending her playing career, was not an active player when the team was announced.  Swoopes, Thompson, and Lisa Leslie (Los Angeles Sparks) were the only three first team selections to have been drafted in 1997 and to have played in each of the ten seasons of the WNBA. Thompson and Leslie were among the six players who only played on one team their entire careers.

Players selected

All-Decade Team
Note: all information only pertains to the first ten seasons of the league's existence.

Honorable mention

Each woman, save Lauren Jackson (Australia), won her Olympic medal(s) competing for the United States.
The inaugural WNBA All-Star Game took place during the 1999 season, and the game has been contested yearly since, although the 2004 edition was supplanted by a game between WNBA players from both conferences and the 2004 United States Olympic team. Appearances in the 2004 game are still considered All-Star appearances.
Players who were voted to start in all-star games but were unable to play due to injury are nevertheless considered to have been starters; players voted as reserves who started in place of other injured players are nevertheless considered to have been reserves.

Other finalists

Janeth Arcain
Swin Cash
Tamecka Dixon
Jennifer Gillom1
Becky Hammon

Shannon Johnson
Vickie Johnson
Rebecca Lobo1
Mwadi Mabika
Taj McWilliams-Franklin

DeLisha Milton-Jones
Deanna Nolan
Nykesha Sales
Andrea Stinson
Natalie Williams1

1 Retired at time of All-Decade Team announcement.

References

External links
All-Decade Team announcement from the WNBA

A
All-Decade Team